Fáilte Ireland is the operating name of the National Tourism Development Authority of the Republic of Ireland. This authority was established under the National Tourism Development Authority Act of 2003 and replaces and builds upon the functions of Bord Fáilte, its predecessor organisation.

Name
The legal name of the body is the National Tourism Development Authority, according to the National Tourism Development Authority Act 2003 which established it. The 2003 act also empowers the body to use the trading name of Fáilte Ireland. The word fáilte is Irish for "welcome". In official Irish-language texts the form Fáilte Éireann has been used.

History

After the foundation of the Irish Free State in December 1922, hoteliers and others created local tourism boards in various regions, which combined in 1924 into the Irish Tourism Association (ITA), a private organisation "promoting tourism to the benefit of the nation". (An earlier, unionist-led, ITA existed from 1895 to 1921.) ITA lobbying led to the Irish Tourist Board being established by the Tourist Traffic Act 1939. This was renamed An Bord Fáilte by the Tourist Traffic Act 1952, which created a separate body, Fógra Fáilte, to handle publicity. The Tourist Traffic Act 1955 remerged the two as Bord Fáilte Éireann (BFÉ or "Bord Fáilte"). An Tóstal, a summer cultural festival held from 1953 to 1959, took up the bulk of the authority's work in this period. In 1963 the Council of Education, Recruitment and Training  (CERT) was created to take over training of workers in the hospitality industry.

In 1964, eight regional tourist organisations (RTOs) were established which were intended to supersede the ITA; an extraordinary general meeting called in 1964 to dissolve the ITA voted not to do so, but it nevertheless soon became defunct. The RTOs reduced in number to six in the 1980s, and were renamed regional tourist associations (RTAs) in 1996.
In 1989 the Dublin RTO lost a High Court action to prevent BFÉ dissolving it; it was reconstituted as Dublin Tourism and more closely controlled by BFÉ.

In 2003 CERT and BFÉ merged to form Fáilte Ireland, to better co-ordinate with Tourism Ireland, the all-Ireland body established under the Good Friday Agreement. The advent of travel websites reduced the usefulness of the RTAs and a 2005 PricewaterhouseCoopers report recommended substantial reorganisation; as a consequence all were dissolved in 2006, except Dublin Tourism, which was made a direct subsidiary of Fáilte Ireland. Dublin Tourism's separate status ended in 2012 in line with a 2011 report by Grant Thornton.

Fáilte Ireland played a leading role in The Gathering Ireland 2013, a year-long programme of events encouraging members of the Irish diaspora to visit their region of origin.

Activities
The goal of Fáilte Ireland is to provide strategic and practical support in developing and sustaining the Republic of Ireland as a "high-quality and competitive tourist destination". Fáilte Ireland works in partnership with tourism interests to support the industry in its efforts to be more profitable and to help individual tourist enterprises enhance their performance.

Its activities fall into four areas:
Tourism marketing: provides marketing support and a range of promotional opportunities for Irish product providers, marketing groups, tour operators, handling agents, and other tourism interests as well as visitor services to consumers. Fáilte Ireland's "Festivals and Cultural Events Initiative" and "Sports Tourism Initiative" fall under this heading.
Training services: provides education and advice for people working in the tourism industry. Fáilte Ireland have previously run campaigns to encourage and support young people into choosing a career in the tourism sector.
Product development: provides support for selective capital investment in tourism product through grant-aid and tax incentive schemes and encourages new products and areas of service.
Research and statistics: provides overviews of tourism performance and profiles tourism development to provides a knowledge base to guide industry development and services.

Management team

On 15 August 2020, Chairman of Fáilte Ireland Michael Cawley resigned after it emerged he travelled to Italy on holiday during the COVID-19 pandemic; his decision to holiday abroad had sparked controversy and criticism as it coincided with a campaign from Fáilte Ireland urging holidaymakers to engage in staycations.

Tourism regions
Fáilte Ireland has identified and markets several tourism regions, including The Wild Atlantic Way, Ireland's Ancient East, and Ireland's Hidden Heartlands.

Dublin Tourism, a somewhat antonymous regional tourism authority, was formerly responsible for promoting tourism in the Dublin region. It merged into Fáilte Ireland in 2012.

See also

The Gathering Ireland 2013
Tourism Ireland
Northern Ireland Tourist Board

References

Sources

Citations

External links

Tourism in the Republic of Ireland
Government agencies of the Republic of Ireland
Tourism in Ireland
Tourism agencies
2003 establishments in Ireland
Organizations established in 2003
Department of Tourism, Culture, Arts, Gaeltacht, Sport and Media